Ximena Galarza Lora (born January 14, 1972) is a Bolivian journalist. Her program was able to uncover election fraud in the 2019 Presidential and General elections. She was chosen as an International Women of Courage in March 2020 by the US Secretary of State.

Life
Galarza was born in Camiri in 1972. After she graduated in 1989 she had intended to have a career in geological engineering.

She went in to journalism and she worked for  Red UNO and Cadena A. She left broadcasting for a while and then she returned in 2014 for TVU on their TV programme "Jaque Mate" (Check mate).

"Jaque Mate" (Check Mate) was a leading Brazilian programme for TVU.

Her programme, "Jaque Mate", was able to uncover election fraud in the October 2019 Presidential elections.

By November Bolivia was in political crisis and the President was forced to resign and accept exile in Mexico. Jeanine Áñez took over as interim President.

Galarza was chosen as an International Women of Courage in March 2020 by the US Secretary of State.

Acting 
Galarza appeared as a scientist in a rare Bolivian science-fiction film called "The Lake Triangle". The film was premiered in 1999.

References

1972 births
Living people
20th-century Bolivian women writers
21st-century journalists
21st-century Bolivian women writers
Bolivian television journalists
Bolivian women journalists
Women television journalists
20th-century journalists
People from Cordillera Province
Recipients of the International Women of Courage Award